Isenburg-Büdingen-Birstein was a County of southern Hesse, Germany, located to the north of Gelnhausen. Isenburg-Büdingen-Birstein was created as a partition of Isenburg-Büdingen in 1511, and was partitioned into Isenburg-Birstein, Isenburg-Büdingen, and Isenburg-Offenbach in 1628.

Counts of Isenburg-Büdingen-Birstein (1511–1711)
John III (1511–1533)
Reinhard (1533–1568) with...
Philip (1533–1596) with...
Louis III (1533– 1588)
Wolfgang Ernest I (1596–1633)
Wolfgang Henry (1633-1635)
Johann Ludwig (1635-1685)
Wilhelm Moritz I (1685-1711)

Princes of Isenburg-Büdingen-Birstein (1711-present)
Wolfgang Ernest I (1711-1754)
Wolfgang Ernest II (1754-1803)
Karl (1803-1820)
Wolfgang Ernest III (1820-1866)
Karl (1866-1899)
Leopold (1899-1933)
Franz Joseph (1933-1939)
Franz Ferdinand (1939-1956)
Franz Alexander (1956–present), is the father of Sophie, Princess of Prussia
Alexander, Hereditary Prince of Isenburg (b.1969) his heir apparent

External links 
Fürstenhaus Isenburg

Counties of the Holy Roman Empire
House of Isenburg
States and territories established in 1511
1511 establishments in the Holy Roman Empire